The Eparchy of Saint Vladimir the Great of Paris is an eparchy of the Ukrainian Greek Catholic Church, a sui iuris church of the Roman Catholic Church. Its territory encompasses France, Belgium, Luxemburg, the Netherlands and Switzerland. 
 
Its cathedral is the Cathédrale Saint-Volodymyr-le-Grand in the episcopal see of Paris.

The former eparch Borys Gudziak was appointed as Archeparch of Ukrainian Catholic Archeparchy of Philadelphia on 4 February 2019, while Hlib Lonchyna, Eparch of Ukrainian Catholic Eparchy of the Holy Family of London was appointed as apostolic administrator. Lonchyna resigned as the Eparch of the Holy Family in London on 1 September 2019, replaced by Kenneth Nowakowski in 2020.

History 
The eparchy was erected on 22 July 1960 as apostolic exarchate for the French, Benelux and Swiss  faithful of the Ukrainian Greek Catholic Church.
 
On 19 January 2013 the exarchate  was elevated in the rank of the eparchy by Pope Benedict XVI. It remains immediately subject to the Major Archbishop of Kyiv–Halyč, without belonging to his metropolitan province.

List of former Hierarchs

See also 
 Catholic Church
 Ukrainian Greek Catholic Church
 Ukrainian Catholic Eparchy of Holy Family of London

Sources and external links
 Official website of the Eparchy
 GCatholic.org information

Eastern Catholicism in France
Eastern Catholic dioceses in France
Ukrainian Greek Catholic eparchies